No More Mr. Nice Guy is a 1993 German comedy film directed by Detlev Buck. It was entered into the 43rd Berlin International Film Festival where it won an Honourable Mention.

Cast
 Joachim Król as Rudi Kipp  'Kipp'
 Horst Krause as Moritz Kipp a.k.a. 'Most'
 Konstantin Kotljarov as Viktor
 Sophie Rois as Nadine
 Heinrich Giskes as Kommissar (detective)
 Lutz Weidlich as Landvermesser (surveyor)
 Doris Bierett as Cafedame (Lady at the cafe)
 Christine Harbort as Cafedame (Lady at the cafe)
 Hans Martin Stier as Tankstellenverkaeufer (service man at gas station)
 Jan Gregor Kremp as Wegelagerer (highwayman)
 Uwe Dag Berlin as Wegelagerer (highwayman)
 Rainer Gladosch as Wegelagerer (highwayman)
 Christian Schild as Wegelagerer (highwayman)
 Tom Uhrig as Wegelagerer (highwayman)

References

External links

1993 films
1993 comedy-drama films
German comedy-drama films
1990s German-language films
Films directed by Detlev Buck
1990s German films